"Jelly" is the sixth analog single by Japanese electronica band Capsule. It was released on April 19, 2006, as a single for their seventh album Fruits Clipper. "Jelly" was first found as a bonus track on the album L.D.K. Lounge Designers Killer if purchased from iTunes. An album-mix of "Jelly" and "CrazEEE Skyhopper" were later added to Fruits Clipper, while "Seismic Charge" was available as a remixed bonus track if purchased from iTunes. A remixed version of "Jelly" was featured on their album Capsule Rmx.

Track listing

Cover versions
In 2011, "Jelly" was covered by Kyary Pamyu Pamyu who is also produced by Yasutaka Nakata. Kyary's cover was released as a single for her debut EP Moshi Moshi Harajuku.

References

External links

2006 singles
Songs written by Yasutaka Nakata
Capsule (band) songs
Kyary Pamyu Pamyu songs
2011 singles
Song recordings produced by Yasutaka Nakata